Pamela E. Queen is an American politician who serves as a Delegate to the Maryland House of Delegates representing Maryland's 14th Legislative District in northern Montgomery County.

Personal life 
Queen was born in New York City and attended Tuskegee University, where she earned a B.S. in mathematics. She later went on to earn two master's degrees from Johns Hopkins University in computer science and management and a Ph.D. in finance from the George Washington University. Since 2010, she has worked as a professor of finance at Morgan State University in Baltimore, Maryland. Queen has been involved in a number of community and professional organizations.

In the legislature 
In 2016, following the appointment of Delegate Craig Zucker to the Maryland Senate, Queen, a member of the Montgomery County Democratic Central Committee, was appointed by that committee to serve in the House of Delegates. She is the second African American woman to represent Montgomery County in the Maryland General Assembly. She was sworn in on February 26, 2016.

Committee assignments
 Member, Economic Matters Committee, 2019–present (business regulation subcommittee, 2019–present; public utilities subcommittee, 2019–present; chair, banking, consumer protection & commercial law subcommittee, 2020–present; joint electric universal service program work group, 2020–present)
 Co-Chair, Study Group on Economic Stability, 2019–present
 Member, Joint Electric Universal Service Program Work Group, 2020–present
 Member, Judiciary Committee, 2016–2018 (criminal justice subcommittee, 2017–2018)

Other memberships
 Vice-Chair, Metro Washington Area Committee, Montgomery County Delegation, 2017–present
 Member, Legislative Black Caucus of Maryland, 2016–present (financial secretary, 2016–2018; treasurer, 2018–2019)
 Member, Women Legislators of Maryland, 2016–present
 Member, Maryland Legislative Latino Caucus, 2021–present

Political positions

Abortion 
In January 2019, Queen was one of nine Maryland lawmakers to add their names to a manifesto signed by 326 state legislators to reaffirm their commitment to protecting abortion rights.

Education 
Queen introduced legislation in the 2019 legislative session that would begin teaching students about organ donation at the age of 14.

National politics 
In September 2018, Queen called for a county investigation into sexual assault allegations made against Supreme Court nominee Brett Kavanaugh. Montgomery County law enforcement officials declined to investigate the matter unless the alleged victim filed a complaint.

In December 2019, Queen attended a rally in Olney, Maryland to call for the impeachment and removal of Donald Trump.

Redistricting 
In 2019, Queen co-sponsored legislation that would place a referendum to add an amendment to the Constitution of Maryland prohibiting partisan redistricting on the 2020 ballot.

Social issues 
Queen introduced legislation in the 2019 legislative session that would provide additional Supplemental Nutrition Assistance Program benefits to low-income children during summer months and winter break. The bill passed and became law on May 28, 2019.

Queen introduced legislation in the 2021 legislative session that would remove the governor from the state's parole board. The bill passed the House of Delegates by a vote of 93-41.

Electoral history

References 

Living people
Democratic Party members of the Maryland House of Delegates
21st-century American politicians
Tuskegee University alumni
Johns Hopkins University alumni
George Washington University School of Business alumni
Morgan State University faculty
21st-century American women politicians
Politicians from New York City
People from Olney, Maryland
1958 births